Yuriy Panchuk (born 28 April 1965) is a Ukrainian bobsledder. He competed in the two man event at the 1998 Winter Olympics.

References

1965 births
Living people
Ukrainian male bobsledders
Olympic bobsledders of Ukraine
Bobsledders at the 1998 Winter Olympics
Sportspeople from Kyiv